The 2011 PSA World Series Finals is the men's edition of the 2011 PSA World Series Finals (prize money: $110 000). The top 8 players in the PSA World Series 2011 were qualified for the event. The event took place at the Queen's Club in London in England between 4–8 January 2012. Amr Shabana won his first PSA World Series Finals trophy, beating Grégory Gaultier in the final.

Seeds

Group stage results

Group 1

Group 2

Draw and results

See also
2011 WSA World Series Finals
PSA World Tour 2011
PSA World Series 2011
PSA World Series Finals

References

External links
PSA World Series website
World Series Final 2011 official website
World Series Final 2011 Squash Site website
World Series Final 2011 SquashInfo website

PSA World Tour
W
2011 in English sport
Squash competitions in London